Platycheirus manicatus is a species of hoverfly. It is found across the Palearctic and in Alaska.

Description
External images
For terms, see: Morphology of Diptera. Mouth edge is projecting beyond facial knob, and abdomen has four pairs of large yellow marks. Thorax dorsum is dull; tibiae and tarsi of leg 1 are diagnostic.

Distribution
Palearctic: Fennoscandia south to Iberia, the Mediterranean basin, Ireland eastwards through Europe into Turkey and Russia then Siberia and the Altai. Nearctic: Alaska and Greenland.

Biology
Habitat: fen, humid, grassland (to above  in the Alps), moorland and taiga. It flies May to September.

References

Diptera of Europe
Syrphinae
Insects described in 1822